The JAC Refine M2 is a compact MPV produced by JAC. Previously named the JAC Heyue RS, the product was moved from the Heyue series to the newly established Refine series just like many of the other products in the Refine series.

History 
The original JAC Heyue RS was revealed in 2011 with prices ranging from 72,800 yuan to 93,800 yuan. Later a facelift was revealed in 2012 significantly changing the front and rear.

Powertrain 
The standard Heyue compact MPV is powered by a 1.5 liter engine, while the Heyue RS is powered by a 1.8 liter engine with 105kw and 165nm.

References

External links 
http://www.jac.com.cn/jacweb/rfm2/20140301/637.shtml Official site] - In Chinese

M2
Minivans
Front-wheel-drive vehicles
2010s cars
Cars introduced in 2011